Chloe Woodruff (born July 21, 1987) is an American cross-country cyclist. She placed 14th in the women's cross-country race at the 2016 Summer Olympics.

She has qualified to represent the United States at the 2020 Summer Olympics.

References

1987 births
Living people
American female cyclists
Olympic cyclists of the United States
Cyclists at the 2016 Summer Olympics
21st-century American women